Anapisona is a genus of araneomorph spiders in the family Anapidae, first described by Willis J. Gertsch in 1941.

Species
 it contains thirteen species, found from Mexico to Brazil:
Anapisona aragua Platnick & Shadab, 1979 – Colombia, Venezuela
Anapisona ashmolei Platnick & Shadab, 1979 – Ecuador
Anapisona bolivari Georgescu, 1987 – Venezuela
Anapisona bordeaux Platnick & Shadab, 1979 – Virgin Is., Brazil
Anapisona furtiva Gertsch, 1941 – Panama
Anapisona guerrai Müller, 1987 – Colombia
Anapisona hamigera (Simon, 1898) – Panama, Colombia, Venezuela, St. Vincent
Anapisona kartabo Forster, 1958 – Guyana
Anapisona kethleyi Platnick & Shadab, 1979 – Mexico, Costa Rica
Anapisona pecki Platnick & Shadab, 1979 – Ecuador
Anapisona platnicki Brignoli, 1981 – Brazil
Anapisona schuhi Platnick & Shadab, 1979 – Brazil
Anapisona simoni Gertsch, 1941 – Panama

References

Anapidae
Araneomorphae genera
Spiders of Central America
Spiders of South America